Meixner  is a surname. Notable people with the surname include:

Josef Meixner (1908–1994), German theoretical physicist
Josef Meixner (sport shooter) (born 1939), Austrian former sports shooter
Karl Meixner (1903–1976), Austrian film actor
Ronny Meixner (born 1964), German racing driver 

See also
Meixner polynomials, are a family of discrete orthogonal polynomials introduced by Josef Meixner
Meixner–Pollaczek polynomials, are a family of orthogonal polynomials P(λ) n(x,φ) introduced by Meixner 
Q-Meixner polynomials, are a family of basic hypergeometric orthogonal polynomials in the basic Askey scheme
Q-Meixner–Pollaczek polynomials (not to be confused with q-Meixner polynomials) are a family of basic hypergeometric orthogonal polynomials in the basic Askey scheme.

References

German-language surnames